William Arthur Pollon (August 20, 1914 – March 28, 2009) was a Canadian curler. He was the second of the 1953 Brier Champion team (skipped by Ab Gowanlock), representing Manitoba.

References

Brier champions
1914 births
2009 deaths
Curlers from Manitoba
Sportspeople from Dauphin, Manitoba
Canadian male curlers